The 2001 Arena Football League season was the 15th season of the Arena Football League. The league champions were the Grand Rapids Rampage, who defeated the Nashville Kats in ArenaBowl XV.

Relocation
 The New England Seawolves was purchased by TD Securities and were relocated to Toronto to become the Toronto Phantoms.
 On October 19, 2000, the Albany Firebirds announced they were relocating the Indianapolis.
 On November 1, 2000, the Iowa Barnstormers announced that they relocated to New York to become the New York Dragons.

Standings

 Green indicates clinched playoff berth
 Purple indicates division champion
 Grey indicates best regular season record

Playoffs

All-Arena team

References